Thy Will Be Done is an American heavy metal band formed in 2005 from Providence, Rhode Island. The ensemble has released the studio albums Was and Is to Come and In Ancient of Days via Stillborn Records, as well as the EP Temple via Eye.On Lion Recordings. Since the release of Temple, the band has recorded two cover songs: 'Emerald' by Thin Lizzy and 'March of the Pigs' by Nine Inch Nails, as well as released two singles, 'Breath of Light' and 'Last Ghost to Kill'.

The band toured with DevilDriver, Suffocation, and Goatwhore with fill-in bassist Jeff Golden who would later go on to join Crowbar.

In 2012, the band performed with Metallica at Orion Music + More, as well as Party to the Apocalypse 2012 starring Shadows Fall, God Forbid and Trumpet the Harlot.

In December 2015, Thy Will Be Done had been working on the follow-up to their Temple EP when the band's drummer, Jay Waterman, suffered cardiac arrest amidst tracking the band's new album, resulting in a provisional break from performances for the band.

On May 26th, 2020 while reporting on the band's new single, 'Last Ghost to Kill', the site, MetalSucks, incorrectly reported that drummer, Jay Waterman had died.

Thy Will Be Done has been occasionally misidentified as a "religious band", but they do not have a religious agenda and think that that is mainly a "personal journey".

Discography

Studio albums 
 Was and Is to Come (2007) (Heatseekers No. 9)
 In Ancient of Days (2009)

EPs 
 Temple (2012) (Heatseekers No. 9)

Timeline

Studio and live lineup

References

External links 
 

Groove metal musical groups
Metalcore musical groups from Rhode Island